Pinostilbene is a stilbenoid found in Gnetum venosum and in the bark of Pinus sibirica.

References 

Stilbenoids